Motorpoint Arena may refer to:

Cardiff International Arena
Motorpoint Arena Nottingham
Sheffield Arena, formerly known as Motorpoint Arena Sheffield